Lee Jun-ho (born January 25, 1990), known mononymously as Junho, is a South Korean singer, songwriter, dancer, composer and actor. He is a member of the South Korean boy band 2PM.

In 2013, Junho debuted as an actor in the Korean movie Cold Eyes. Junho is most known for his roles in Good Manager (2017), Rain or Shine (2017–18), Wok of Love (2018), and The Red Sleeve (2021).

Lee Junho was the first idol-actor to win Best Actor at 2022's Korea PD Awards, and also won the awards for Most Popular Actor and Best Actor – Television at the 58th Baeksang Arts Awards, becoming the first idol to win the latter. Lee Junho was also the first idol-actor to win Top Excellence Award, Actor in a miniseries in Apan Star Awards and first-idol actor to win   Grand Prize (Daesang) for Actor of the year at 2022 Asia Artist Awards Lee Junho is listed in Elle Japan Top 16 Hallyu Best Actor in 2022, placing second.

Pre-debut
Junho first gained public attention when he won Superstar Survival in 2006. The show started with twelve teenage competitors and, as the weeks went on, they were eliminated one by one until three were left. The process followed a similar style to that of reality show Survivor. Junho signed a contract with JYP Entertainment after winning the contest, placing first out of 6,500 competitors. Future 2PM bandmates Taecyeon and Chansung had also competed.

Education
Junho took an undergraduate program at Howon University (Gunsan, South Korea) with his bandmates Chansung and Wooyoung. In addition, along with Chansung, he is continuing a master's degree of cinematography at Sejong University.

Music career

2PM

In 2008, he took part in Mnet's Hot Blood Men which follows the extreme training of 13 trainees in order to become a member of the boy band One Day. One Day spawned two boy bands, 2AM and 2PM.

Six months after Hot Blood was aired on TV, 2PM debuted with their first single "10점 만점에 10점" ("10 Points out of 10 Points") from their first EP Hottest Time of the Day, but it wasn't until their second EP 2:00PM Time For Change which skyrocketed their success in the Korean music industry. As of 2017, the group has released six studio albums in Korea and four studio albums in Japan.

Solo activities
Junho debuted as a solo singer in Japan in 2013 with his first solo mini album, Kimi no Koe, for which he produced, composed and wrote all the tracks. The album landed on no. 1 in Tower Records′ charts and no. 3 on Oricon's daily chart. On July 9, Junho began his first solo tour, Junho 1st Solo Tour Kimi no Koe which ended on August 29 in Tokyo.

On July 9, 2014, Junho released his second self-composed Japanese mini-album, FEEL. FEEL topped Oricon's daily album chart the day of its release. From July 3 to August 13, Junho embarked on his second solo tour in Japan titled  Junho Solo Tour 2014 - Feel which traveled to five different Japanese cities.

On July 15, 2015, Junho released his third Japanese mini-album, SO GOOD. The album ranked third in Oricon's weekly music chart, and sold more than 40,000 albums in its first week. He embarked on his 2015 Japan tour Last Night in seven cities, which started July 7.

In September, he released his first album in Korea, a special compilation album titled One. The album contained Korean version of 11 self-composed Japanese songs that were released in the past. He concluded his solo concert "Last Night" at Seoul which was held at the Olympic Hall in Olympic Park, Seoul, from September 19–20.

In 2016, Junho released his fourth Japanese mini-album, DSMN. The album topped Oricon Daily Chart and also the daily sales rankings at Tower Records. Moreover, the pre-released single "DSMN" was also popular in Japan's ringtone website. He embarked on his fourth Japanese tour Hyper which concluded to a 20,000 audience in Tokyo on August 25.
On the 3rd and 4 December Junho held a special Encore Concert "LAST HYPER NIGHT" in Nippon Budokan. For the 4th of December concert, there was a live viewing event throughout Japan.

In 2017, Junho released his fifth Japanese mini-album 2017 S/S in Japan. The album achieved the best records for Junho thus far, peaking at number two on Oricon's weekly music chart. From July to August, Junho embarked on his fifth Japanese tour 2017 S/S.

In the same year, his first Korean mini-album Canvas was released, marking his official debut in the Korean music industry as a solo artist.

In January 2018, Junho released the single, “Winter Sleep” in both Korean and Japanese. Starting from January 20 to February 24, Junho embarked on his first solo winter tour in Japan, the Winter Special Tour “冬の少年” which included nine stops in five cities.

On July 11 of 2018, Junho released his seventh Japanese mini album Imagination (Souzou). On the daily album chart of Japan's largest music statistics-tracking company Oricon for July 10, the mini album took No. 1 with estimated sales of 27,270 units. His summer solo tour "Flashlight"' started in late June and continued until early September, with thirteen stops in five cities in Japan.

On December 5 of the same year, Junho released a Japanese compilation album ‘Junho the Best‘, containing sixteen tracks. From December 6 to 8, Junho held his Last Concert "JUNHO THE BEST" in Nippon Budokan.

In January 2019, Junho released his second Korean compilation album titled Two. Lee will hold a solo concert series titled “Junho the Best in Seoul” in March.

On July 1, 2022, Lee held a fan meeting Lee Jun-ho 2022 Fan-Con 'Before Midnight' held on August 12–14 in Korea and August 20–21 in Japan.

Composition

The first song Junho was credited for on a 2PM album was "Give it to Me" in 2011, on their second studio album Hands Up. Junho's first contribution to a Japanese release was "Kimi ga Ireba" (君がいれば; If You Are Here), released as part of 2PM's fourth Japanese single album Beautiful on June 6, 2012, and which was also included on their second Japanese studio album, Legend of 2PM.

In 2012, Junho coupled with actress Kim So-eun on MBC's Music and Lyrics for the song "Sad Love", written by Kim So-eun and composed by Junho. The single was a hit and debuted at top 10 spots on various music charts, and was chosen as the theme song of MBC's weekend drama Feast of the Gods. He also collaborated with Vanness Wu in the song "Undefeated" for Taiwanese drama Ti Amo Chocolate soundtrack.

The song "Move On", written by Junho and fellow member Jang Wooyoung, which was included in 2PM's 2PM Best~ 2008-2011 in Korea album, topped Japan's Recochoku Chart. In 2013, Junho participated as a composer for Wooyoung's Korean debut EP 23, Male, Single with the song "Be With You". The song "Love Is True", which featured vocals from Junho and Nichkhun, was included in the bonus CD of 2PM's Go Crazy! Korean album released in 2014. In 2016, Junho wrote the song "Versus", which was recorded as a duet with Hwang Chan-sung and was released in the limited edition version D of 2PM's Japanese album Galaxy of 2PM.

As of February 2019, Junho is credited with a hundred songs at the Korea Music Copyright Association, placing him on number 7 of the top ten idols with most copyrighted songs.

Acting career
Junho made his film debut in the action thriller Cold Eyes, where he impressed viewers for his acting.

In 2015, Junho featured in martial arts period drama Memories of the Sword. He next starred alongside Kim Woo-bin and Kang Ha-neul in the coming-of-age film  Twenty.

In 2016, Junho had a supporting role in tvN's thriller Memory.

In 2017, Junho starred in the hit office comedy drama Good Manager. He was praised for his villainous acting in the drama as the arrogant director of finances. The same year, Junho landed his first lead role in JTBC's romantic melodrama series Rain or Shine. He played a psychologically scarred survivor of a fatal incident.

In 2018, Junho was cast in his first Japanese movie Rose and Tulip, written by popular manga artist Akiko Higashimura, in which he played a double role. He was then cast in the SBS romance comedy drama Wok of Love, playing a star chef. The same year, he was cast in the historical comedy film Gibang Bachelor.

In 2019, Junho was cast in the legal drama Confession.

In November 2021, he starred the historical romance drama The Red Sleeve, playing the role of Crown Prince Yi San, alongside Lee Se-young as Royal Consort Uibin Seong. The drama became a success, sweeping 8 awards at the 2021 MBC Drama Awards, with him getting Top Excellence Award. Lee Junho was the first idol-actor to win Best Actor at 2022's Korea PD Awards, and also won the awards for Most Popular Actor and Best Actor – Television at the 58th Baeksang Arts Awards, becoming the first idol to win the latter. Lee Junho was also the first idol-actor to win Top Excellence Award, Actor in a miniseries in Apan Star Awards and first-idol actor to win   Grand Prize (Daesang) for Actor of the year at 2022 Asia Artist Awards

Other activities
In 2012, Junho was appointed as the honorary ambassador of the 24 Hour Famine Program hosted by World Vision.

In the same year, along with the 2PM members, Junho participated in MBC's God of Victory, where they were pitted against the members of Shinhwa. Junho won the segment "Breaking Chopsticks With His Butt", as he was able to break 28 chopstick pairs with his rear end in under 15 seconds.

In 2013, Junho's solo variety show titled 2PM Junho's SAY YES -Friendship- was broadcast on Tokyo MX. The show features Junho travelling across different places in Japan to make friends along with invited Japanese celebrities.

On May 30, 2019, Junho began his military service as a public service worker. Due to a severe shoulder injury he suffered in 2010 during acrobatics practice and for which he underwent a large surgery in 2012, he was judged unfit for active duty. Junho was discharged on March 20, 2021.

Discography

Filmography

Film

Television series

Web series

Television show

Hosting

Music video appearances

Awards and nominations

Listicles

References

External links

 

1990 births
Living people
2PM members
JYP Entertainment artists
People from Goyang
South Korean male film actors
South Korean male idols
South Korean male singers
South Korean male television actors
South Korean pop singers
Howon University alumni